The Doug Gottlieb Show is an afternoon drivetime sports talk and debate radio show on Fox Sports Radio that airs weekdays 3–6pm ET.
The show was formerly on ESPN Radio from 2006-2012. Since debuting on November 13, 2006, the host of the program has been hosted by former Oklahoma State Cowboys guard and current Fox Sports college basketball analyst Doug Gottlieb.  Jon Stashower was the SportsCenter anchor for the show in the 8pm-11pm slot until 2008, when he was moved to the afternoon spot allowing anchors Marc Kestecher and Neil Jackson to split the time between 8pm–11pm. He rejoined the show on February 2, 2009 when it was moved to its earlier slot.

The debuting of The Doug Gottlieb Show, caused a major shake up in the ESPN Radio lineup, as SportsNation on ESPN Radio was dropped completely from the airwaves and The Brian Kenny Show was created to take up the later slot, from 8pm-10pm.

Since joining ESPN Radio in September 2003, Gottlieb had co-hosted GameNight along with personalities such as Chuck Wilson, Jeff Rickard, John Seibel and Freddie Coleman. Due to Gottlieb's extensive work for ESPN's college basketball coverage, the primary fill-in host for the program during the evening was Andy Gresh but since Gresh's departure from ESPN Radio, Jason Smith was the regular substitute for Gottlieb.

On July 31, 2012 it was announced that Gottlieb had signed with CBS and would no longer be appearing on ESPN.  His last show on ESPN was July 30, and his first with CBS was January 2, 2013.
Gottlieb joined Fox Sports 1 and Fox Sports Radio on March 22, 2017. His last show at CBS Sports Radio was on April 14, 2017.

Design

Segments
Game Time:  Doug Gottlieb Show sports news update correspondent Dan Beyer gives Gottlieb a different game to play each day of the week.  Games include: "Psychic", "The Draft", "Rank'em", along with others.
What Does the Fox Say?: Since joining Fox Sports, Gottlieb gives his take on what his Fox Sports colleagues had to say on certain topics.
The Press:  Gottlieb ends the show by giving his take on current sports news.

References

American sports radio programs
Sirius XM Radio programs
Conservative talk radio